Nicole Goullieux (born 15 July 1931) is a former French athlete, who specialized in the 800 meters and in Cross Country.

Biography 
Goullieux was born in Paris. She won six titles French National 800m Championships in 1952, 1953, 1957, 1958, 1959 and 1962. She also won five French Cross Country Championships, between the years of 1956 to 1963. Goullieux improved the French 800 meters record three times, running 2:12.7 and 2:10.5 in 1955 and 2:09.5 in 1959.

In 1959, she won the gold medal in the 800 m during the Summer Universiade, at Turin in the time 2:11.1. She participated in the 1960 Olympics at Rome, but did not advance past the first round of the 800 m trials.

Prize list 
 French Championships in Athletics   :
 winner of the 800m 1952, 1953, 1957, 1958, 1959 and 1962.
 French Cross Country Championships :
 winner in 1956, 1959, 1960, 1961 and 1963

Records

Notes and references

External links 
 
 
 

1931 births
Living people
French female middle-distance runners
Olympic athletes of France
Athletes (track and field) at the 1960 Summer Olympics
Universiade medalists in athletics (track and field)
Universiade gold medalists for France
Athletes from Paris
Medalists at the 1959 Summer Universiade